In The Church of Jesus Christ (Bickertonite), the Quorum of Seventy Evangelists is a leadership body of the church. The prescribed duty of the evangelists is to preach the gospel of Jesus Christ to every nation, kindred, language, and people.

Responsibilities
The Quorum of Seventy Evangelists is responsible for management of the International Missionary Programs of the church and assists Regions of the church with their individual Domestic Missionary Programs. The Quorum of Seventy oversees the activities of its Missionary Operating Committees to ensure the fulfilling of Christ’s commandment to take the gospel to the entire world.

History

Current officers
As of 2016, the officers of the Quorum of Seventy Evangelists are:

Evangelist  Wayne Martorana, President
Evangelist Robert Nicklow, Jr., Vice-President
Evangelist Bryan Griffith, Secretary

Members 1862–1920

Members 1921–1941

Members 1941–1956

Members 1957–1969

References 

Latter Day Saint hierarchy
Leadership positions in the Church of Jesus Christ (Bickertonite)
Religious organizations established in 1862
1862 establishments in Pennsylvania